Foe Hammer can refer to:

The sword Glamdring (in Sindarin: 'glam'=foe, 'dring'=hammer) in the works of J. R. R. Tolkien
King Roland of Delain's mighty Arrow in Stephen King's novel The Eyes of the Dragon
The primary weapons of the MCRN Donnager in The Expanse (novel series)